The Unique Golden Triangle is a 26-storey,  skyscraper office building completed in 1992 and located in Yongkang District, Tainan, Taiwan. The building has 3 basement levels and has 8 elevators.

See also 
 List of tallest buildings in Asia
 List of tallest buildings in Taiwan
 Shangri-La's Far Eastern Plaza Hotel Tainan

References

1992 establishments in Taiwan
Skyscrapers in Tainan
Skyscraper office buildings in Taiwan
Office buildings completed in 1992